Apete Temo (born 15 November 1968) is a Fijian boxer. He competed in the men's light welterweight event at the 1988 Summer Olympics.

References

External links

1968 births
Living people
Light-welterweight boxers
Fijian male boxers
Olympic boxers of Fiji
Boxers at the 1988 Summer Olympics
Place of birth missing (living people)